The 816th Expeditionary Airlift Squadron was a provisional United States Air Force unit.  It is assigned to the 385th Air Expeditionary Group, stationed at Al Udeid Air Base, Doha, Qatar. It was last engaged in combat operations in Southwest Asia.

During World War II as the 816th Bombardment Squadron, it was one of the last B-17 Flying Fortress heavy bomber squadrons deployed to Southern Italy as part of the Fifteenth Air Force's 483d Bombardment Group in March 1944.  The squadron earned two Distinguished Unit Citations in combat over Germany.  After the war, it helped transport American soldiers returning to the United States until it was inactivated in Italy.

The squadron was activated as the 816th Troop Carrier Squadron in 1953 in Japan, when it replaced a reserve unit that had been activated for the Korean War.  It airlifted troops and materiel in the Pacific until inactivating in 1956.

Mission
The 816th was equipped with Boeing C-17 Globemaster III transported and supported Coalition forces engaging in combat operations as part of Operation Enduring Freedom and Operation Iraqi Freedom, and also operated in the Horn of Africa.  The mission of the 816th was to provide global strategic airlift, airdrop, aeromedical evacuation and humanitarian relief, to create an air bridge for personnel, equipment and supplies throughout their assigned areas of responsibility.

History

World War II

The squadron was activated at Ephrata Army Air Base as the 816th Bombardment Squadron (Heavy) on 20 September 1943 as one of the four original squadrons of the 483d Bombardment Group. In November, the squadron moved to MacDill Field, Florida, where it trained with Boeing B-17 Flying Fortresses under Third Air Force.

The 816th deployed to the Mediterranean Theater of Operations, where it became part of Fifteenth Air Force at Sterparone Airfield in Southern Italy. The squadron's air element flew its Flying Fortresses to Sterparone via Tortorella Airfield, while the ground element moved to Sterparone via troop ship. It began operations in April 1944 with an attack on a cement factory in Split, Yugoslavia.

The squadron engaged in long-range strategic bombardment of enemy military, industrial and transport targets, including factories, oil refineries, marshalling yards, airfields, and troop concentrations in Italy, France. Southern Germany, Austria, Czechoslovakia, and the Balkans. In June 1944, the squadron participated in a shuttle mission, departing Italy and landing in the Soviet Union, attacking targets en route and on the return flight.  This enabled attacks on targets too far from the squadron's base to strike and return home. The squadron received a Distinguished Unit Citation for combat action two months later.  On 18 July 1944 the squadron, along with the other elements of the 483d Group, bombed the objective, an airfield and installations at Memmingen, engaging numerous enemy aircraft in the target area despite a lack of cover from its planned fighter escort.  It received a second citation for braving fighter assaults and flak to bomb tank factories at Berlin on 24 March 1945.

The squadron was occasionally diverted from the strategic attack on Germany. It struck targets in southern France in preparation for Operation Dragoon, the invasion of August 1944.  The group also supported ground forces in northern Italy during the Allied offensive in April 1945.

After V-E Day, the unit moved to Pisa Airfield, where it operated under the control of Air Transport Command's Green Project which was the movement of troops back to the United States.  The squadron carried troops from Pisa to a staging area in Morocco.  Its B-17s were disarmed with flooring and seats for 25 passengers installed.  It carried passengers from Pisa to Port Lyautey Airfield, French Morocco for further movement them across the Atlantic.  The squadron was inactivated in Italy in September 1945.

Airlift in the Pacific Area

The Air Force was returning the 403d Troop Carrier Wing, which was stationed at Ashiya Air Base during the Korean War, to reserve status at the beginning of 1953.  The 403d Wing had been mobilized in April 1951 and had moved to Japan a year later. In its place, the Air Force activated the 483d Troop Carrier Wing. The 816th was activated as the 816th Troop Carrier Squadron and absorbed the mission, personnel and Fairchild C-119 Flying Boxcars of the 64th Troop Carrier Squadron, which was simultaneously inactivated.

In June 1953, the squadron, along with the other squadrons of the 483d Wing, airlifted the 187th Regimental Combat Team from Japan to Korea, to prevent a breakthrough by North Korean and Chinese Communist forces before an armistice agreement could be signed. It performed troop carrier and air transport operations in the Far East, including landing of troops and cargo in forward areas of the combat zone, air transportation of airborne troops and equipment, and air evacuation of casualties, receiving a Korean Presidential Unit Citation for these actions.  For its actions in transporting United Nations troops in Korea and training with airborne units, the squadron was one of the first units to earn an Air Force Outstanding Unit Award.  Between April 1953 and September 1954, the squadron aided the French Air Force in Indochina by training personnel and hauling supplies. On 17 September 1956, the squadron moved to Tachikawa Air Base, Japan, where it was inactivated the following day and its aircraft and crews transferred to the 374th Troop Carrier Group at Tachikawa.

Expeditionary operations

Reactivated in 2006 as a Boeing C-17 Globemaster III squadron after the United States invasion of Afghanistan. Provided intra-theater transport within Southwest Asia and other locations as directed in support of units engaged in combat operations.  During a recent deployment of personnel. the aircrews flew about 3,000 sorties in the C-17 Globemaster III, logged more than 8,000 flying hours and airlifted more than 148 million pounds of cargo and more than 37,000 airmen, soldiers, sailors, marines and distinguished visitors throughout Southwest Asia.

Lineage
 Constituted as the 816th Bombardment Squadron (Heavy) on 14 September 1943
 Activated on 20 September 1943
 Redesignated 816th Bombardment Squadron, Heavy c. September 1944
 Inactivated on 25 September 1945
 Redesignated 816th Troop Carrier Squadron, Medium on 15 November 1952
. Activated on 1 January 1953
 Inactivated on 18 September 1956
 Redesignated 816th Expeditionary Airlift Squadron and converted to provisional status on 12 June 2002
 Activated on 1 October 2006

Assignments
 483d Bombardment Group, 20 September 1943 – 25 September 1945
 483d Troop Carrier Group, 1 January 1953 – 18 September 1956
 Air Mobility Command to activate or inactivate at any time after 12 June 2002
 385th Air Expeditionary Group, 1 October 2006
 379th Expeditionary Operations Group, unknown–present

Stations
 Ephrata Army Air Base, Washington, 20 September 1943
 MacDill Field, Florida, 7 November 1943 – 2 March 1944
 Sterparone Airfield, Italy, 9 April 1944
 Pisa Airfield, Italy, 15 May-25 September 1945
 Ashiya Air Base, Japan, 1 January 1953
 Tachikawa Air Base, Japan, 17–18 September 1956
 Al Udeid Air Base, Doha, Qatar, 1 October 2006 – present

Aircraft
 Boeing B-17 Flying Fortress, 1943–1945
 C-119 Flying Boxcar, 1953–1956
 C-17 Globemaster III, 2006–present

See also

 Boeing B-17 Flying Fortress Units of the Mediterranean Theater of Operations

References

Notes
 Explanatory notes

 Citations

Bibliography

 
 
 

Airlift squadrons of the United States Air Force